This is a list of the England national football team results from 1960 to 1979 (matches 338–536).

1960s

1960

1961

1962

1963

1964

1965

1966

1967

1968

1969

1970s

1970

1971

1972

1973

1974

1975

1976

1977

1978

1979

References

1960s in England
1970s in England
1960-79

de:Liste der Länderspiele der englischen Fußballnationalmannschaft